Lake Overstreet is a lake in Leon County, Florida, United States. Access to the lake is only by hiking and mountain bike trails.

The lake and land surrounding it were part of the Lafayette Land Grant. During antebellum years, this lake was within Andalusia Plantation owned by Frenchman Emile Dubois. Later, it was the western border of Live Oak Plantation.

Fish found in Lake Overstreet include largemouth bass, bluegills and bream.

Sources 
Taltrust
Paisley, Clifton; From Cotton To Quail, University of Florida Press, c1968.

Overstreet
Overstreet